Andamina Jeevitam  is a famous Telugu novel by Malladi Venkata Krishna Murthy.
This novel is about friendship between a man and a woman. The names of two characters in this novel are Shanthi and Priyatam.

History
Andamina Jeevitam was written during the 1980s. Initially it was published as a serial in a magazine. Later it was published as a book. Final re-print of a revised version is released in the year 2010. In the 2011 same novel is released as e-book.

Plot

Sources

Novels first published in serial form
Telugu-language mass media
20th-century Indian novels
Works originally published in Indian magazines
1980s novels